TLO is a bus company group in Finland.

TLO may also refer to:

 Talodi language, by ISO 639-3 code
 Technology Licensing Office, another term for university technology transfer offices
 T. L. O., an unnamed high school student involved in the U.S. Supreme Court case New Jersey v. T. L. O.
 Total Loss Only, a type of maritime insurance policy
 TLO, company acquired by TransUnion
 The Last One, software published in 1981 that took input from a user and generated a program in BASIC